This is a list of Monuments of National Importance (ASI) as officially recognized by and available through the website of the Archaeological Survey of India in the Indian union territory Dadra and Nagar Haveli and Daman and Diu. The monument identifier is a combination of the abbreviation of the subdivision of the list (state, ASI circle) and the numbering as published on the website of the ASI. 12 Monuments of National Importance have been recognized by the ASI in Dadra and Nagar Haveli and Daman and Diu.

List of monuments of national importance 

|}

See also
 List of Monuments of National Importance in India for other Monuments of National Importance in India

References 

Dadra and Nagar Haveli and Daman and Diu
Monuments of National Importance
Tourist attractions in Dadra and Nagar Haveli and Daman and Diu